Ana Timotić (born 30 December 1982) is a former professional Serbian tennis player.

During her career, Timotić won nine singles titles and two doubles titles on the ITF Circuit.

She also made 19 appearances for the Serbia Fed Cup team (previously Serbia and Montenegro), scoring 3–6 in singles and 6–4 in doubles.

Personal life
Timotić was born and raised in Belgrade, and currently resides in Dubai, UAE with her husband Cesar Ferrer-Victoria where she runs a tennis academy called Ferrer Timotić Tennis Academy. She has named Danica Krstajić and Dragana Zarić as her best friends among professional players,.

ITF finals

Singles: 21 (9–12)

Doubles: 5 (2–3)

References

External links
 
 
 

1982 births
Living people
Sportspeople from Subotica
Serbian female tennis players
Serbia and Montenegro female tennis players